Leroy Keith Jr. (born 1939) is a businessman and educator, the eighth president of Morehouse College, its second alumni President. Keith helped to double Morehouse's endowment from $27 million in 1987 to $60 million in 1993. However he resigned from Morehouse in 1994 after a financial audit found that the fringe benefits he received from the college, including a college-owned house, could jeopardize the school's tax status."

Keith was appointed chancellor of the Massachusetts Board of Higher Education in 1975, the first African American to hold such a position in the US. He was executive vice president of the University of Massachusetts System, and associate dean of the college and assistant professor of education and urban studies at Dartmouth College.

In 1997, Keith executed a buyout of Carson Products—makers of Dark & Lovely and Magic Shave—becoming its first African American chairman and CEO. Under his management, the company quadrupled in value and became a publicly traded company.

Personal life
Keith is married to Anita Keith and they have four daughters.

References

Living people
1939 births
20th-century American educators
Presidents of Morehouse College